Gil Cordovés Pérez (born March 14, 1965) is a track and road racing cyclist. Formerly a competitor for Cuba, Cordovés thereafter competed for Venezuela.

Major results

1995
 Pan American Games
1st 1 km Time Trial
3rd Individual sprint
1999
 1st Stage 7 Vuelta a Venezuela
2000
 Vuelta a Venezuela
1st Points classification
1st Sprints classification
2001
 Vuelta a Venezuela
1st Stages 2, 3, 8, 10b & 13
 1st Prologue (ITT) Vuelta Ciclista a Costa Rica
2002
 Vuelta a Venezuela
1st Stages 1, 4, 9b & 10
 1st Prologue (ITT) Vuelta Ciclista a Costa Rica
2003
 1st Clasico Corre Por La Vida
 Vuelta a Venezuela
1st Stages 1, 3, 5b, 6, 8, 12 & 14
 1st Stage 3 Vuelta a Colombia
2004
 1st Overall Clasico Aniversario Federacion Ciclista de Venezuela
 1st Overall Vuelta al Estado Zulia
 Vuelta a Venezuela
1st Stages 1, 2, 5, 7, 9b, 13 & 14
 1st Stage 5 Volta do Río de Janeiro
2005
 1st Overall Vuelta al Estado Zulia
1st Stages 1, 4, 5 & 6
 Vuelta a Venezuela
1st Stages 5, 12 & 14
 Vuelta a la Independencia Nacional
1st Prologue (ITT), Stages 5a & 9
 Vuelta Ciclista Aragua
1st Stages 1 & 2
 1st Stage 2 Vuelta al Tachira
2006
 1st Overall Vuelta al Estado Zulia
1st Stages 2a, 2b, 4, 6, 7a & 7b
 1st Overall Vuelta al Estado Portugesa
1st Stages 2, 3, 4b & 5
 1st Overall Clasico Aniversario Federacion Ciclista de Venezuela
 Vuelta a Venezuela
1st Stages 1, 3, 6, 7, 9, 11 & 14
 Vuelta Internacional al Estado Trujillo
1st Stages 1, 2 & 3
 Vuelta a Yacambu-Lara
1st Stages 2b & 3
 1st Stage 1 Vuelta Ciclista Aragua
 1st Stage 2a Vuelta al Oriente
 1st Stage 3 Clasico Ciclistico Banfoandes
2007
 1st Overall Vuelta al Estado Zulia
1st Stages 1, 2 & 4b
 Vuelta a Venezuela
1st Stages 1b, 3, 7, 13 & 14
 Vuelta al Oriente
1st Stages 1, 2, 3, 4 & 6
 Vuelta al Estado Portugesa
1st Stages 2, 4 & 6
 Vuelta a Yacambu-Lara
1st Stages 2b & 5
 1st Stage 3 Clasico Pedro Infante
 1st Stage 1 Clasico Ciclistico Banfoandes
2008
 1st Overall Vuelta a los Valles de Tuy
1st Stage 1
 1st Clasico ciudad de Caracas
 Vuelta a la Independencia Nacional
1st Prologue (ITT), Stages 2, 5b, 6 & 9
 Vuelta a Venezuela
1st Stages 6, 8 & 13
 Clasico Ciclistico Banfoandes
1st Stages 2 & 4
 1st Stage 2 Vuelta al Oriente
 1st Stage 1 Vuelta al Estado Zulia
 2nd Clasico Corre Por La Vida
 3rd Virgen de la Candelaria
2010
 Vuelta a Venezuela
1st Stages 3, 5 & 11
 1st Stage 3 Vuelta al Táchira
2011
 1st Stage 7 Vuelta a Venezuela
 4th Clasico FVCiclismo Corre Por la VIDA
2012
 Vuelta a Venezuela
1st  Sprints classification
1st Stage 3
2014
 2nd National Road Race Championships

References
 

1965 births
Living people
Cuban male cyclists
Venezuelan male cyclists
Cyclists at the 1995 Pan American Games
Vuelta a Colombia stage winners
Vuelta a Venezuela stage winners
Place of birth missing (living people)
Pan American Games medalists in cycling
Pan American Games gold medalists for Cuba
Pan American Games bronze medalists for Cuba
Medalists at the 1995 Pan American Games